Nikolayevsk-on-Amur Airport  is an airport serving the locality of Nikolayevsk-on-Amur, in the Khabarovsk Krai of Russia.

Airlines and destinations

External links

References

  

 Russian AIP1603b4_ru, Book 4, page 1720

Airports built in the Soviet Union
Airports in Khabarovsk Krai